Vilen Isaakovych Barskyi (born 27 October 1930, Kyiv - 24 December 2012, Dortmund, Germany) was a Ukrainian Soviet  and Germans artist (painter and graphic artist) and member of the Union of Artists of the USSR, . He was a Russian-speaking poet of Jewish origin, an essayist, a prominent representative of postmodernism, conceptualism and underground culture, as well as author of experimental works of graphopoetry and a teacher.

Biography 

Vilen Barsky was born on 27 October 1930 in Kyiv, capital of Ukrainian Soviet Socialist Republic. His father was an engineer, and his mother was a pharmacist. His childhood memories were closely related to the Botanic garden, since his family lived across from it. During the war, the family was evacuated to Stalingrad, then, before the decisive battle, moved to Sernur (Mari Autonomous Soviet Socialist Republic), and returned to Kyiv after the war.

In 1951, Barsky graduated from the Kyiv Art School (now Shevchenko State Art School) and entered the Kyiv Art Institute.

In 1957, he graduated from the Kyiv Art Institute, Faculty of Painting and Graphics, faculty of Painting and Graphics. After graduating from the institute he began experimenting in the field of fine arts, creating abstract compositions.

Due to his ideologically unbiased position, the artist came under pressure from the Soviet authorities. Thus, in 1959, after a home search, he was taken to the KGB office. As a result, he lost the right to government orders and participation in exhibitions for a long time, sharing the participation of the best representatives of the generation of the sixties.

In 1967, he joined the Union of Artists of the USSR.

In 1981, he left Soviet Kyiv and settled in Dortmund with his wife, the poetess Olga Denisova.

He was a talented teacher. Among his students were Vera Veisberg, Olena Golub,  Konstyantin Samoilenko, Nicholas Zalevsky, Yury Kharchenko  and many  others.

He died in Dortmund on 24 December 2012.

Art 
Barskyi's search for and formation of his own path in art was connected with his active interest in the work of outstanding artists in various fields. He listened to the philosophical and aesthetic concept of his senior colleague Valery Lamakh, set out in the "Schemes". He was delighted with the talent of director Sergei Parajanov.

Feeling various influences, Barskyi maintained self-identification. He experimented a lot, looking for new means of artistic expression: there are works made using an airbrush (1965), smoke and fire (1968), a template of his own hand (1969).

1981— under the pseudonym Victor Belenin, he published six visual poems in the Ark magazine, published in Paris. In the same year, they are shown at the exhibition "L'emigration Russe. L’art en Voyage ”at the Trans / form gallery in Paris.

1982 — holds a solo exhibition at the Catholic Academy Schwerte (Germany). A catalog of Barsky's works created in 1959–1980 is published for the event.

1990s — Barsky's works are published in Ukraine and Russia, in particular in the literary-critical magazine Zoil (1997), the anthology Samizdat Veka (1997), the poetry collection Dom s Chimerami (2000), and others.

References 

20th-century German painters
20th-century German male artists
Jewish artists
Artists from Kyiv
German poets
1930 births
2012 deaths
German essayists
21st-century German painters
21st-century German male artists